CITES (shorter name for the Convention on International Trade in Endangered Species of Wild Fauna and Flora, also known as the Washington Convention) is a multilateral treaty to protect endangered plants and animals from the threats of international trade. It was drafted as a result of a resolution adopted in 1963 at a meeting of members of the International Union for Conservation of Nature (IUCN). The convention was opened for signature in 1973 and CITES entered into force on 1 July 1975.

Its aim is to ensure that international trade (import/export) in specimens of animals and plants included under CITES, does not threaten the survival of the species in the wild. This is achieved via a system of permits and certificates. CITES affords varying degrees of protection to more than 38,000 species.

, Secretary-General of CITES is Ivonne Higuero.

Background
CITES is one of the largest and oldest conservation and sustainable use agreements in existence. There are three working languages of the Convention (English, French and Spanish) in which all documents are made available. Participation is voluntary and countries that have agreed to be bound by the convention are known as Parties. Although CITES is legally binding on the Parties, it does not take the place of national laws. Rather it provides a framework respected by each Party, which must adopt their own domestic legislation to implement CITES at the national level.

Originally, CITES addressed depletion resulting from demand for luxury goods such as furs in Western countries, but with the rising wealth of Asia, particularly in China, the focus changed to products demanded there, particularly those used for luxury goods such as elephant ivory or rhinoceros horn. As of 2022, CITES has expanded to include thousands of species previously considered unremarkable and in no danger of extinction such as manta rays or pangolins.

Ratifications

The text of the convention was finalized at a meeting of representatives of 80 countries in Washington, D.C., United States, on 3 March 1973. It was then open for signature until 31 December 1974. It entered into force after the 10th ratification by a signatory country, on 1 July 1975. Countries that signed the Convention become Parties by ratifying, accepting or approving it. By the end of 2003, all signatory countries had become Parties. States that were not signatories may become Parties by acceding to the convention. , the convention has 184 parties, including 183 states and the European Union.

The CITES Convention includes provisions and rules for trade with non-Parties. All member states of the United Nations are party to the treaty, with the exception of Democratic People's Republic of Korea, Federated States of Micronesia, Haiti, Kiribati, Marshall Islands, Nauru, South Sudan, East Timor, Turkmenistan, and Tuvalu. UN observer the Holy See is also not a member. The Faroe Islands, an autonomous region in the Kingdom of Denmark, is also treated as a non-Party to CITES (both the Danish mainland and Greenland are part of CITES).

An amendment to the text of the convention, known as the Gaborone Amendment allows regional economic integration organizations (REIO), such as the European Union, to have the status of a member state and to be a Party to the convention.  The REIO can vote at CITES meetings with the number of votes representing the number of members in the REIO, but it does not have an additional vote.

In accordance with Article XVII, paragraph 3, of the CITES Convention, the Gaborone Amendment entered into force on 29 November 2013, 60 days after 54 (two-thirds) of the 80 States that were party to CITES on 30 April 1983 deposited their instrument of acceptance of the amendment.  At that time it entered into force only for those States that had accepted the amendment. The amended text of the convention will apply automatically to any State that becomes a Party after 29 November 2013. For States that became party to the convention before that date and have not accepted the amendment, it will enter into force 60 days after they accept it.

Regulation of trade
CITES works by subjecting international trade in specimens of listed taxa to controls as they move across international borders. CITES specimens can include a wide range of items including the whole animal/plant (whether alive or dead), or a product that contains a part or derivative of the listed taxa such as cosmetics or traditional medicines.

Four types of trade are recognised by CITES - import, export, re-export (export of any specimen that has previously been imported) and introduction from the sea (transportation into a state of specimens of any species which were taken in the marine environment not under the jurisdiction of any state). The CITES definition of "trade" does not require a financial transaction to be occurring. All trade in specimens of species covered by CITES must be authorized through a system of permits and certificates prior to the trade taking place. CITES permits and certificates are issued by one or more Management Authorities in charge of administering the CITES system in each country. Management Authorities are advised by one or more Scientific Authorities on the effects of trade of the specimen on the status of CITES-listed species. CITES permits and certificates must be presented to relevant border authorities in each country in order to authorise the trade.

Each party must enact their own domestic legislation to bring the provisions of CITES into effect in their territories. Parties may choose to take stricter domestic measures than CITES provides (for example by requiring permits/certificates in cases where they would not normally be needed or by prohibiting trade in some specimens).

Appendices
Over 38,000 species, subspecies and populations are protected under CITES. Each protected taxa or population is included in one of three lists called Appendices. The Appendix that lists a taxa or population reflects the level of the threat posed by international trade and the CITES controls that apply.

Taxa may be split-listed meaning that some populations of a species are on one Appendix, while some are on another. The African bush elephant (Loxodonta africana) is currently split-listed, with all populations except those of Botswana, Namibia, South Africa and Zimbabwe listed in Appendix I.  Those of Botswana, Namibia, South Africa and Zimbabwe are listed in Appendix II.  There are also species that have only some populations listed in an Appendix. One example is the pronghorn (Antilocapra americana), a ruminant native to North America. Its Mexican population is listed in Appendix I, but its U.S. and Canadian populations are not listed (though certain U.S. populations in Arizona are nonetheless protected under other domestic legislation, in this case the Endangered Species Act).

Taxa are proposed for inclusion, amendment or deletion in Appendices I and II at meetings of the Conference of the Parties (CoP), which are held approximately once every three years. Amendments to listing in Appendix III may be made unilaterally by individual parties.

Appendix I
Appendix I taxa are those that are threatened with extinction and to which the highest level of CITES protection is afforded. Commercial trade in wild-sourced specimens of these taxa is not permitted and non-commercial trade is strictly controlled by requiring an import permit and export permit to be granted by the relevant Management Authorities in each country before the trade occurs.

Notable taxa listed in Appendix I include the red panda (Ailurus fulgens), western gorilla (Gorilla gorilla), the chimpanzee species (Pan spp.), tigers (Panthera tigris subspecies), Asian elephant (Elephas maximus), some populations of African bush elephant (Loxodonta africana), and the monkey puzzle tree (Araucaria araucana).

Appendix II
Appendix II taxa are those that are not necessarily threatened with extinction, but trade must be controlled in order to avoid utilization incompatible with their survival. Appendix II taxa may also include species similar in appearance to species already listed in the Appendices. The vast majority of taxa listed under CITES are listed in Appendix II. Any trade in Appendix II taxa standardly requires a CITES export permit or re-export certificate to be granted by the Management Authority of the exporting country before the trade occurs.

Examples of taxa listed on Appendix II are the great white shark (Carcharodon carcharias), the American black bear (Ursus americanus), Hartmann's mountain zebra (Equus zebra hartmannae), green iguana (Iguana iguana), queen conch (Strombus gigas), emperor scorpion (Pandinus imperator), Mertens' water monitor (Varanus mertensi), bigleaf mahogany (Swietenia macrophylla), lignum vitae (Guaiacum officinale) and all stony corals (Scleractinia spp.).

Appendix III
Appendix III species are those that are protected in at least one country, and that country has asked other CITES Parties for assistance in controlling the trade.
Any trade in Appendix III species standardly requires a CITES export permit (if sourced from the country that listed the species) or a certificate of origin (from any other country) to be granted before the trade occurs.

Examples of species listed on Appendix III and the countries that listed them are the two-toed sloth (Choloepus hoffmanni) by Costa Rica, sitatunga (Tragelaphus spekii) by Ghana and African civet (Civettictis civetta) by Botswana.

Exemptions and special procedures
Under Article VII, the Convention allows for certain exceptions to the general trade requirements described above.

Pre-Convention specimens
CITES provides for a special process for specimens that were acquired before the provisions of the Convention applied to that specimen. These are known as "pre-Convention" specimens and must be granted a CITES pre-Convention certificate before the trade occurs. Only specimens legally acquired before the date on which the species concerned was first included in the Appendices qualify for this exemption.

Personal and household effects
CITES provides that the standard permit/certificate requirements for trade in CITES specimens do not generally apply if a specimen is a personal or household effect. However there are a number of situations where permits/certificates for personal or household effects are required and some countries choose to take stricter domestic measures by requiring permits/certificates for some or all personal or household effects.

Captive bred or artificially propagated specimens
CITES allows trade in specimens to follow special procedures if Management Authorities are satisfied that they are sourced from captive bred animals or artificially propagated plants. 
In the case of commercial trade of Appendix I taxa, captive bred or artificially propagated specimens may be traded as if they were Appendix II. This reduces the permit requirements from two permits (import/export) to one (export only). 
In the case of non-commercial trade, specimens may be traded with a certificate of captive breeding/artificial propagation issued by the Management Authority of the state of export in lieu of standard permits.

Scientific exchange
Standard CITES permit and certificates are not required for the non-commercial loan, donation or exchange between scientific or forensic institutions that have been registered by a Management Authority of their State. Consignments containing the specimens must carry a label issued or approved by that Management Authority (in some cases Customs Declaration labels may be used). Specimens that may be included under this provision include museum, herbarium, diagnostic and forensic research specimens. Registered institutions are listed on the CITES website.

Amendments and reservations
Amendments to the Convention must be supported by a two-thirds majority who are "present and voting" and can be made during an extraordinary meeting of the COP if one-third of the Parties are interested in such a meeting.  The Gaborone Amendment (1983) allows regional economic blocs to accede to the treaty.  Trade with non-Party states is allowed, although permits and certificates are recommended to be issued by exporters and sought by importers.

Species in the Appendices may be proposed for addition, change of Appendix, or de-listing (i.e., deletion) by any Party, whether or not it is a range State and changes may be made despite objections by range States if there is sufficient (2/3 majority) support for the listing.  Species listings are made at the Conference of Parties.

Upon acceding to the Convention or within 90 days of a species listing being amended, Parties may make reservations. In these cases, the party is treated as being a state that is not a Party to CITES with respect to trade in the species concerned. Notable reservations include those by Iceland, Japan, and Norway on various baleen whale species and those on Falconiformes by Saudi Arabia.

Shortcomings and concerns

Implementation
As of 2002, 50% of Parties lacked one or more of the four major CITES requirements - designation of Management and Scientific Authorities; laws prohibiting the trade in violation of CITES; penalties for such trade and laws providing for the confiscation of specimens.

Although the Convention itself does not provide for arbitration or dispute in the case of noncompliance, 36 years of CITES in practice has resulted in several strategies to deal with infractions by Parties. The Secretariat, when informed of an infraction by a Party, will notify all other parties. The Secretariat will give the Party time to respond to the allegations and may provide technical assistance to prevent further infractions. Other actions the Convention itself does not provide for but that derive from subsequent COP resolutions may be taken against the offending Party. These include:
Mandatory confirmation of all permits by the Secretariat
Suspension of cooperation from the Secretariat
A formal warning
A visit by the Secretariat to verify capacity
Recommendations to all Parties to suspend CITES related trade with the offending party
Dictation of corrective measures to be taken by the offending Party before the Secretariat will resume cooperation or recommend resumption of trade
Bilateral sanctions have been imposed on the basis of national legislation (e.g. the USA used certification under the Pelly Amendment to get Japan to revoke its reservation to hawksbill turtle products in 1991, thus reducing the volume of its exports).

Infractions may include negligence with respect to permit issuing, excessive trade, lax enforcement, and failing to produce annual reports (the most common).

Approach to biodiversity conservation
General limitations about the structure and philosophy of CITES include: by design and intent it focuses on trade at the species level and does not address habitat loss, ecosystem approaches to conservation, or poverty; it seeks to prevent unsustainable use rather than promote sustainable use (which generally conflicts with the Convention on Biological Diversity), although this has been changing (see Nile crocodile, African elephant, South African white rhino case studies in Hutton and Dickinson 2000). It does not explicitly address market demand. In fact, CITES listings have been demonstrated to increase financial speculation in certain markets for high value species. Funding does not provide for increased on-the-ground enforcement (it must apply for bilateral aid for most projects of this nature).

There has been increasing willingness within the Parties to allow for trade in products from well-managed populations.  For instance, sales of the South African white rhino have generated revenues that helped pay for protection.  Listing the species on Appendix I increased the price of rhino horn (which fueled more poaching), but the species survived wherever there was adequate on-the-ground protection. Thus field protection may be the primary mechanism that saved the population, but it is likely that field protection would not have been increased without CITES protection. In another instance, the United States initially stopped exports of bobcat and lynx hides in 1977 when it first implemented CITES for lack of data to support no detriment findings.  However, in this Federal Register notice, issued by William Yancey Brown, the U.S. Endangered Species Scientific Authority (ESSA) established a framework of no detriment findings for each state and the Navajo nation and indicated that approval would be forthcoming if the states and Navajo nation provided evidence that their furbearer management programs assured the species would be conserved.  Management programs for these species expanded rapidly, including tagging for export, and are currently recognized in program approvals under regulations of the U.S. Fish and Wildlife Service.

Drafting
By design, CITES regulates and monitors trade in the manner of a "negative list" such that trade in all species is permitted and unregulated unless the species in question appears on the Appendices or looks very much like one of those taxa. Then and only then, trade is regulated or constrained.  Because the remit of the Convention covers millions of species of plants and animals, and tens of thousands of these taxa are potentially of economic value, in practice this negative list approach effectively forces CITES signatories to expend limited resources on just a select few, leaving many species to be traded with neither constraint nor review.  For example, recently several bird classified as threatened with extinction appeared in the legal wild bird trade because the CITES process never considered their status.  If a "positive list" approach were taken, only species evaluated and approved for the positive list would be permitted in trade, thus lightening the review burden for member states and the Secretariat, and also preventing inadvertent legal trade threats to poorly known species.

Specific weaknesses in the text include: it does not stipulate guidelines for the 'non-detriment' finding required of national Scientific Authorities; non-detriment findings require copious amounts of information; the 'household effects' clause is often not rigid enough/specific enough to prevent CITES violations by means of this Article (VII); non-reporting from Parties means Secretariat monitoring is incomplete; and it has no capacity to address domestic trade in listed species.

In order to ensure that the General Agreement on Tariffs and Trade (GATT) was not violated, the Secretariat of GATT was consulted during the drafting process.

Animal sourced pathogens
During the coronavirus pandemic in 2020 CEO Ivonne Higuero noted that illegal wildlife trade not only helps to destroy habitats, but these habitats create a safety barrier for humans that can prevent pathogens from animals passing themselves on to people.

Reform suggestions
Suggestions for improvement in the operation of CITES include: more regular missions by the Secretariat (not reserved just for high-profile species); improvement of national legislation and enforcement; better reporting by Parties (and the consolidation of information from all sources-NGOs, TRAFFIC, the wildlife trade monitoring network and Parties); more emphasis on enforcement-including a technical committee enforcement officer; the development of CITES Action Plans (akin to Biodiversity Action Plans related to the Convention on Biological Diversity) including: designation of Scientific/Management Authorities and national enforcement strategies; incentives for reporting and timelines for both Action Plans and reporting.  CITES would benefit from access to Global Environment Facility (GEF), funds-although this is difficult given the GEFs more ecosystem approach-or other more regular funds.  Development of a future mechanism similar to that of the Montreal Protocol (developed nations contribute to a fund for developing nations) could allow more funds for non-Secretariat activities.

TRAFFIC Data 
From 2005 to 2009 the legal trade corresponded with these numbers:
 317,000 live birds
 More than 2 million live reptiles
 2.5 million crocodile skins
 2.1 million snake skins
 73 tons of caviar
 1.1 million beaver skins
 Millions of pieces of coral
 20,000 mammalian hunting trophies
In the 1990s the annual trade of legal animal products was $160 billion annually. In 2009 the estimated value almost doubled to $300 billion.

Additional information about the documented trade can be extracted through queries on the CITES website.

Meetings
The Conference of the Parties (CoP) is held once every three years. The location of the next CoP is chosen at the close of each CoP by a secret ballot vote.

The CITES Committees (Animals Committee, Plants Committee and Standing Committee) hold meetings during each year that does not have a CoP, while the Standing committee meets also in years with a CoP.  The Committee meetings take place in Geneva, Switzerland (where the Secretariat of the CITES Convention is located), unless another country offers to host the meeting. The Secretariat is administered by UNEP. The Animals and Plants Committees have sometimes held joint meetings.  The previous joint meeting was held in March 2012 in Dublin, Ireland, and the latest one was held in Veracruz, Mexico, in May 2014.

A current list of upcoming meetings appears on the CITES calendar.

At the seventeenth Conference of the Parties (CoP 17), Namibia and Zimbabwe introduced proposals to amend their listing of elephant populations in Appendix II. Instead, they wished to establish controlled trade in all elephant specimens, including ivory. They argue that revenue from regulated trade could be used for elephant conservation and rural communities’ development. However, both proposals were opposed by the US and other countries.

See also

Environmental agreements
Illegal logging 
IUCN Red List
Ivory trade
Lacey Act
List of species protected by CITES Appendix I
List of species protected by CITES Appendix II
List of species protected by CITES Appendix III
Shark finning
Wildlife conservation
Wildlife Enforcement Monitoring System
Wildlife management
Wildlife smuggling
World Wildlife Day

Footnotes

References

Further reading
Oldfield, S. and McGough, N. (Comp.) 2007. A CITES manual for botanic gardens English version, Spanish version, Italian version Botanic Gardens Conservation International (BGCI)

External links 

 
 CITES Profile on database of market governance mechanisms (archived 13 March 2016)

Member countries (Parties)
 Chronological list of Parties
 Alphabetical list of Parties at CITES and at the depositary (PDF)
 National contacts (archived 20 January 2011)

Lists of species included in Appendices I, II and III (i.e. species protected by CITES)
 Explanation of the Appendices
 Number of species on the Appendices
 Species lists (Appendices I, II and III)

Environmental treaties
Endangered species
Treaties concluded in 1973
Treaties entered into force in 1975
Wildlife smuggling
1975 in the environment
Treaties of the Democratic Republic of Afghanistan
Treaties of Albania
Treaties of Algeria
Treaties of Angola
Treaties of Antigua and Barbuda
Treaties of Argentina
Treaties of Armenia
Treaties of Australia
Treaties of Austria
Treaties of Azerbaijan
Treaties of the Bahamas
Treaties of Bahrain
Treaties of Bangladesh
Treaties of Barbados
Treaties of Belarus
Treaties of Belgium
Treaties of Belize
Treaties of the People's Republic of Benin
Treaties of Bhutan
Treaties of Bolivia
Treaties of Bosnia and Herzegovina
Treaties of Botswana
Treaties of the military dictatorship in Brazil
Treaties of Brunei
Treaties of Bulgaria
Treaties of Burkina Faso
Treaties of Burundi
Treaties of Cambodia
Treaties of Cameroon
Treaties of Canada
Treaties of Cape Verde
Treaties of the Central African Republic
Treaties of Chad
Treaties of Chile
Treaties of the People's Republic of China
Treaties of Colombia
Treaties of the Comoros
Treaties of the Republic of the Congo
Treaties of Costa Rica
Treaties of Ivory Coast
Treaties of Croatia
Treaties of Cuba
Treaties of Cyprus
Treaties of Czechoslovakia
Treaties of the Czech Republic
Treaties of Zaire
Treaties of Denmark
Treaties of Djibouti
Treaties of Dominica
Treaties of the Dominican Republic
Treaties of Ecuador
Treaties of Egypt
Treaties of El Salvador
Treaties of Equatorial Guinea
Treaties of Eritrea
Treaties of Estonia
Treaties of the People's Democratic Republic of Ethiopia
Treaties of Fiji
Treaties of Finland
Treaties of France
Treaties of Gabon
Treaties of the Gambia
Treaties of Georgia (country)
Treaties of West Germany
Treaties of East Germany
Treaties of Ghana
Treaties of Greece
Treaties of Grenada
Treaties of Guatemala
Treaties of Guinea
Treaties of Guinea-Bissau
Treaties of Guyana
Treaties of Honduras
Treaties of the Hungarian People's Republic
Treaties of Iceland
Treaties of India
Treaties of Indonesia
Treaties of Pahlavi Iran
Treaties of Iraq
Treaties of Ireland
Treaties of Israel
Treaties of Italy
Treaties of Jamaica
Treaties of Japan
Treaties of Jordan
Treaties of Kazakhstan
Treaties of Kenya
Treaties of Kuwait
Treaties of Kyrgyzstan
Treaties of Laos
Treaties of Latvia
Treaties of Lebanon
Treaties of Lesotho
Treaties of Liberia
Treaties of the Libyan Arab Jamahiriya
Treaties of Liechtenstein
Treaties of Lithuania
Treaties of Luxembourg
Treaties of Madagascar
Treaties of Malawi
Treaties of Malaysia
Treaties of the Maldives
Treaties of Mali
Treaties of Malta
Treaties of Mauritania
Treaties of Mauritius
Treaties of Mexico
Treaties of Monaco
Treaties of Mongolia
Treaties of Montenegro
Treaties of Morocco
Treaties of the People's Republic of Mozambique
Treaties of Myanmar
Treaties of Namibia
Treaties of Nepal
Treaties of the Netherlands
Treaties of New Zealand
Treaties of Nicaragua
Treaties of Niger
Treaties of Nigeria
Treaties of Norway
Treaties of Oman
Treaties of Pakistan
Treaties of Palau
Treaties of Panama
Treaties of Papua New Guinea
Treaties of Paraguay
Treaties of Peru
Treaties of the Philippines
Treaties of Poland
Treaties of Portugal
Treaties of Qatar
Treaties of South Korea
Treaties of Moldova
Treaties of Romania
Treaties of Russia
Treaties of Rwanda
Treaties of Samoa
Treaties of San Marino
Treaties of São Tomé and Príncipe
Treaties of Saudi Arabia
Treaties of Senegal
Treaties of Serbia and Montenegro
Treaties of Seychelles
Treaties of Sierra Leone
Treaties of Singapore
Treaties of Slovakia
Treaties of Slovenia
Treaties of the Solomon Islands
Treaties of the Somali Democratic Republic
Treaties of South Africa
Treaties of Spain
Treaties of Sri Lanka
Treaties of Saint Kitts and Nevis
Treaties of Saint Lucia
Treaties of Saint Vincent and the Grenadines
Treaties of the Democratic Republic of the Sudan
Treaties of Suriname
Treaties of Eswatini
Treaties of Sweden
Treaties of Switzerland
Treaties of Syria
Treaties of Tajikistan
Treaties of Thailand
Treaties of North Macedonia
Treaties of Togo
Treaties of Tonga
Treaties of Trinidad and Tobago
Treaties of Tunisia
Treaties of Turkey
Treaties of Uganda
Treaties of Ukraine
Treaties of the United Arab Emirates
Treaties of the United Kingdom
Treaties of Tanzania
Treaties of the United States
Treaties of Uruguay
Treaties of Uzbekistan
Treaties of Vanuatu
Treaties of Venezuela
Treaties of Vietnam
Treaties of Yemen
Treaties of Yugoslavia
Treaties of Zambia
Treaties of Zimbabwe
Animal treaties
Treaties extended to Aruba
Treaties extended to the Netherlands Antilles
Treaties extended to Greenland
Treaties extended to Portuguese Macau
Treaties extended to British Honduras
Treaties extended to Bermuda
Treaties extended to the British Indian Ocean Territory
Treaties extended to the British Virgin Islands
Treaties extended to the Cayman Islands
Treaties extended to the Falkland Islands
Treaties extended to Gibraltar
Treaties extended to Guernsey
Treaties extended to British Hong Kong
Treaties extended to Jersey
Treaties extended to the Gilbert and Ellice Islands
Treaties extended to the Isle of Man
Treaties extended to Montserrat
Treaties extended to the Pitcairn Islands
Treaties extended to Saint Helena, Ascension and Tristan da Cunha
Treaties entered into by the European Union